Alsophila capensis, synonym Cyathea capensis, (known as the "forest tree fern") is a regionally widespread and highly variable species of tree fern. It is indigenous to Southern Africa (subsp. capensis) and South America (subsp. polypodioides).

Description

The fronds are tripinnate, born on long stipes (stalks), and 2–3 m in length. The main stem of the leaf (rachis) is smooth to slightly warty and covered in scales that range from tan to brown or dark brown. The frond stalks are covered with dark brown or black scales.

The smallest leaflets (pinnae) have toothed (serrated) margins. The lowest pinnae may be separated from the others along the rachis and form a clump around the crown, similar to the "wig" of Alsophila baileyana. This moss-like tuft of tiny, reduced leaves is distinctive for Alsophila capensis, and can be used to identify this species across its range.

The sori occur in two rows, one along each side of the pinnule midvein, and are covered by scale-like indusia.

Distribution
This fern is the only member of the family Cyatheaceae native to both Africa and the Americas. The species is divided into two subspecies:

Alsophila capensis ssp. capensis is native to the Old World tropics in Africa. It is found in Malawi, Mozambique, Tanzania, Eswatini (Swaziland), Zimbabwe, and South Africa (from the Western Cape province to KwaZulu-Natal and Mpumalanga). It grows in cool, shady, moist forest, beside rivers and waterfalls. The specific epithet capensis refers to the Cape of Good Hope in South Africa, where the type specimen was collected.
Alsophila capensis subsp. polypodioides is native to the New World tropics in South America.

Cultivation
Alsophila capensis  is cultivated as an ornamental plant.  It is relatively easy to grow if provided with a semi-shady, moist and sheltered environment, and can likely tolerate several degrees of frost.

References

capensis
Ferns of Brazil
Ferns of Africa
Endemic flora of Brazil
Flora of the Atlantic Forest
Afromontane flora
Flora of Malawi
Flora of Mozambique
Flora of South Africa
Flora of Swaziland
Flora of Tanzania
Flora of Zimbabwe
Trees of South Africa
Garden plants of Africa
Plants described in 1781